Epiphthora drosias is a moth of the family Gelechiidae. It was described by Edward Meyrick in 1904. It is found in Australia, where it has been recorded from South Australia.

The forewings are white, sprinkled with dark fuscous. The hindwings are light grey.

References

Moths described in 1904
Epiphthora
Taxa named by Edward Meyrick